Negro Election Day is a festival that began during 1741 in several towns of New England as part of the local election of the black representative of that community. The festival incorporated aspects of West African culture and ritualistic celebrations such as traditional dancing, African feasting, and parades.

The election process itself was unclear in its methods and was often conducted vocally or by debate rather than the ballot system used by the white voters, although it is known that it has been determined by a contest of strength or speed. African-Americans during pre-revolutionary America had not gained the vote, and did not so until the Fifteenth Amendment was ratified in 1870. Therefore, the Election Day festivities held by their white counterparts did not appeal to the slave population due to the fact that they could not vote themselves. In Puritan New England, the slave owners and freemen organized for the black communities to vote for an official that would act as a intermediary in white and black relations.

As part of this, they granted their slaves one day off to enjoy the festivities and to rejoice.   This ran alongside the main white elections; in some cases, this official proved worthy and though not recognized federally, acted as a reputable liaison. In other cases, however, this official was named the ‘king’ or ‘governor’, and served more as a parody of the newly elected white leader.

After the Civil War (1861–1865) the festival had lost its zeal amongst the black communities for reasons unknown, possibly spurred by the ratification of the Fifteenth Amendment in 1870.

See also
Emancipation Day
Juneteenth

References

Further reading

African-American cultural history